History of the Bay Area can refer to
 The history of the San Francisco Bay Area
 The History of the Galveston Bay Area
 The history of the Tampa Bay Area
 The history of the Monterey Bay Area